Pirhuane (possibly from Aymara pirwa, piwra granary, -ni a suffix to indicate ownership, "the one with a granary") is a  mountain in the Moquegua Region in the Andes of Peru. It is situated in the General Sánchez Cerro Province, Ubinas District. Pirwani is situated northeast of the active volcano Ubinas. Like the mountains south of Pirhuane, Pacoorcco and Huitoni, Pirhuane lies on the eastern border of the buffer zone of the Salinas and Aguada Blanca National Reservation.

References 

Mountains of Peru
Mountains of Moquegua Region